Giovanna dos Santos Nascimento (born 22 April 1997), known as Gi Santos, is a Brazilian women's association football defender, who plays for Beşiktaş J.K. in Turkey. After Brazil, she played in Colombia and Portugal before moving to Turkey. She was a member of the Brazil women's national U20 team.

Private life
She was born in Campo Limpo Paulista, São Paulo, Brazil on 22 April 1997.

Playing career

Club
Gi Santos started her career at the professional women's football club Centro Olímpico in São Paulo in 2016. The same year, she transferred to Foz Cataratas in Foz do Iguaçu Paraná. She took part at the 2016 Copa Libertadores Femenina, and scored a goal. In 2017, she joined Sport Recife in Recife, Pernambuco. After two years, she returned to Foz do Iguaçu for a while. She went to Colombia to play for the transferred to the Bogotá-nased club Independiente Santa Fe. In 2020, she signed with F.C. Famalicão in Vila Nova de Famalicão, Portıgal.

In the beginning of August 2021, she moved to Turkey and joined Beşiktaş J.K., which became champion of the 2020–21 Turkcell League, and so was to play in the 2021–22 UEFA Champions League qualifying rounds. She played in two matches of the 2021–22 UEFA Women's Champions League qualifying rounds.

International
Gi Santos was a member of the Brazil women's national U20 team.

Honours
Foz Cataratas
 Copa Libertadores Femenina
 Third place (1): 2016

References

1997 births
Living people
Brazilian women's footballers
Women's association football defenders
Footballers from São Paulo
Santos FC (women) players
Brazilian expatriate women's footballers
Expatriate women's footballers in Colombia
Brazilian expatriates in Colombia
Expatriate women's footballers in Portugal
Expatriate women's footballers in Turkey
Brazilian expatriate sportspeople in Turkey
Beşiktaş J.K. women's football players
Turkish Women's Football Super League players
F.C. Famalicão (women) players
Campeonato Nacional de Futebol Feminino players
Associação Desportiva Centro Olímpico players
Brazilian expatriate sportspeople in Portugal